Aldwin Walter Meinhardt is a Canadian former swimmer of the 1960s who specialised in the freestyle and butterfly. He was a Commonwealth Games and Pan American Games medalist.

Meinhardt, who is of Austrian descent, swam for the Vancouver Amateur Swim Club and was an All-American on the University of Washington swim team. He was the first Canadian to swim the 100 metre butterfly in under one minute and was also a national record holder in freestyle. In 1964 he briefly held Canada's 100 yard freestyle and 200 yard butterfly records, only to have them both bettered by Daniel Sherry later in the same competition.

References

Year of birth missing (living people)
Living people
Canadian male freestyle swimmers
Canadian male butterfly swimmers
Canadian people of Austrian descent
Commonwealth Games medallists in swimming
Commonwealth Games silver medallists for Canada
Commonwealth Games bronze medallists for Canada
Medallists at the 1962 British Empire and Commonwealth Games
Swimmers at the 1962 British Empire and Commonwealth Games
Pan American Games medalists in swimming
Pan American Games silver medalists for Canada
Medalists at the 1963 Pan American Games
Swimmers at the 1963 Pan American Games
Washington Huskies men's swimmers